Bernardo Frizoni (born 12 March 1990 in Volta Redonda) is a Brazilian football player who plays for Czech club TJ Slavoj Mýt.

Career

FK Bodva Moldava nad Bodvou
In winter 2011, Bernardo Frizoni has signed contract for Slovak club FK Bodva Moldava nad Bodvou.

FK Viktoria Žižkov
On 18 February 2019, Viktoria Žižkov announced that they had signed Bernardo on a contract until 30 June 2019.

Slavoj Mýto
In August–September 2020, Bernardo joined Czech amateur club TJ Slavoj Mýto. As of October 2021, Bernardo was still playing for the club.

External links
Diósgyőr Profile

Profile on Viktoria Žižkov website

References

1990 births
Living people
People from Volta Redonda
Association football midfielders
Brazilian footballers
Budapest Honvéd FC II players
Barcsi SC footballers
FK Bodva Moldava nad Bodvou players
Diósgyőri VTK players
Zalaegerszegi TE players
Lombard-Pápa TFC footballers
FK Železiarne Podbrezová players
Bohemians 1905 players
Hapoel Ashkelon F.C. players
SHB Da Nang FC players
Nemzeti Bajnokság I players
Slovak Super Liga players
2. Liga (Slovakia) players
Liga Leumit players
V.League 1 players
Brazilian expatriate footballers
Expatriate footballers in Hungary
Expatriate footballers in Slovakia
Expatriate footballers in the Czech Republic
Expatriate footballers in Israel
Expatriate footballers in Vietnam
Brazilian expatriate sportspeople in Hungary
Brazilian expatriate sportspeople in Slovakia
Brazilian expatriate sportspeople in the Czech Republic
Brazilian expatriate sportspeople in Israel
Brazilian expatriate sportspeople in Vietnam
Sportspeople from Rio de Janeiro (state)